Marko Jevremović (born 23 February 1996) is a Serbian professional footballer who plays as a left back for FK Javor Ivanjica.

Career
After coming through the youth system of Rad and Brodarac, Jevremović made his first-team debut for Radnički Obrenovac in the Serbian League Belgrade. He was later acquired by Serbian SuperLiga side Mladost Lučani in the 2018 winter transfer window, but immediately loaned to Serbian League West club Sloga Požega for the rest of the season.

References

External links
 

Association football defenders
FK Mladost Lučani players
FK Radnički Obrenovac players
FK Sloga Požega players
FK Javor Ivanjica players
Footballers from Belgrade
Serbian footballers
Serbian SuperLiga players
1996 births
Living people
Serbia international footballers